Argentino Molinuevo can refer to:

 Argentino Molinuevo Sr. (1911-2006), Argentine Olympic equestrian
 Argentino Molinuevo Jr. (born 1945), Argentine Olympic equestrian